Banaganapalli is a town in the state of Andhra Pradesh, India. It lies in Nandyal district, 38 km west of the city of Nandyal. Banaganapalli is famous for its mangoes and has a cultivar, Banaganapalli, named after it. Between 1790 and 1948, Banaganapalli was the capital of the princely state of the same name, Banganapalle State.

Geography
It has an average elevation of 209 metres (688 ft). 

Banaganapalli and Koilakuntla are called Twin towns.

Right Canal of Srisailam Dam SRBC passes near Banaganapalli Town.

History

Banaganapalle Nawabs 
In 1601, Sultan Ismail Adil Shah of Bijapur conquered the fortress of Banaganapalli from Raja Nanda Chakravathy. The fort and surrounding districts were placed under the control of his victorious general, Siddhu Sumbal, who held them until 1665. Muhammad Beg Khan-e Rosebahani was granted Banaganapalli and the surrounding jagir in perpetual fiefdom but died without a male heir, leaving the jagir of Banaganapalli to his adopted son, Faiz Ali Khan Bahadur. Aurangzeb conquered the Sultanate of Bijapur in 1686, but Faiz Ali Khan's fief was secured by the intervention of his maternal uncle Mubariz Khan, who served as Aurangzeb's viceroy of the Deccan. Till 1947, Banaganapalli was independent state under the rule of Nawabs.

Sri Kalagnani Jagadguru Madvirat Pothuluri Veerabrahmendra Swamy 
Sri Pothuluri Veera Brahmendra Swamy wrote Kalagnanam on the hill of Ravvala konda, near Banaganapalli. Sri Kalagnani Jagadguru Madvirat Pothuluri Veerabrahmendra Swamy is one of the great saints of India. He has the knowledge of past, present and future. He is often called as the "Nostradamus of India". His forecastings of which all were proved correct. He forecasts events from his reign to the end of Kaliyuga. He lived 400 years ago. This is known because of the statue which is present in his Ashrama in Banaganapalle. He has written many books on palm leaves. All these palm leaf books tell the future of the world till the end of Kaliyuga. These books tell us about how people get transformed in coming years. He forecasts the changes in political, social, and economic changes that will occur in society, biological and physiological changes that will occur in the plant and animal kingdoms, geographical changes, wars, explosions, etc. And many other wonders of the world which have occurred, such as birth of Mr. Gandhi and his freedom movement and the rule of Mrs. Indira Gandhi in free India. The knowledge in these books is called as Kalagnanam (Knowledge of Time). This will also be called by people as "Sandhra Sindhu Vedam".

Demographics 
As of the 2011 census, the town had a population of 36,056. Banaganapalle is tenth-most populous town in Kurnool district.

Economy 

 Banaganapalli primarily depend on Agriculture. Some Industries are also present in Banaganapalle. 
 Maha Cements factory is located in Yanakandla Village, near Banaganapalle. 
 Stone mining is present in Palukuru VIllage of Banaganapalle Mandal.

Governance 
The town was upgraded from Gram panchayat to Nagar panchayat on 23 June 2011. Later again it is degraded to Grama Panchayt due to some reasons. Now administration is under the Sarpanch.

Banganapalli mangoes

 Banaganapalli mango is a mango variety generally known as The King of Mangoes, named after Banganapalli.
 An unspoilt obliquely oval specimen presents an unblemished golden yellow thin edible skin. These mangoes are large, weighing on an average 350-400 grams. The pulp is fibreless, firm and yellow with sweet taste.
 Banaganapalle Mangoes received a geographical indication tag in May 2017. Banaganapalle mangoes have been grown for over 100 years in Andhra Pradesh.

Transport

Roadways 
The Andhra Pradesh State Road Transport Corporation operates bus services from Banaganapalle bus station with Banaganapalle Bus depot.

Distance to Major towns and cities 

 Nandyal = 40 km
 Kurnool = 75 km
 Adoni = 130 km
 Koilakuntla = 16 km
 Bethamcherla = 20 km
 Dhone = 47 km
 Proddutur = 85 km
 Kadapa = 140 km
 Tirupati = 270 km
 Hyderabad = 290 km
 Bengaluru = 340 km
 Vijayawada = 360 km
 Chennai =  390 km

Railways 

Banaganapalli Railway Station is opened in 2016. It is a part of Nandyal - Yerraguntla Railway line.

Places of interest
 Yaganti
 Nawab Bungalow
 Ravvala Konda
 Mahanandi
 Belum Caves
 Hotel Hindustan

Education
The primary and secondary school education is imparted by government, aided and private schools, under the School Education Department of the state. The medium of instruction followed by different schools are Telugu and English.

See also
Banganapalle State
Nawab of Banganapalle

References

External links

Cities and towns in Nandyal district